Cho Byung-Kwan (born May 5, 1981) is a male freestyle wrestler from South Korea. He participated in Men's freestyle 74 kg at 2008 Summer Olympics. In the 1/16 of final he lost to Buvaisar Saitiev, but he got to the repechage round. There he beat Ahmet Gülhan, but then lost to Iván Fundora and was eliminated.

External links
 
 
 

Living people
1981 births
South Korean wrestlers
South Korean male sport wrestlers
Olympic wrestlers of South Korea
Wrestlers at the 2008 Summer Olympics
Asian Games medalists in wrestling
Wrestlers at the 2002 Asian Games
Wrestlers at the 2006 Asian Games
Medalists at the 2002 Asian Games
Medalists at the 2006 Asian Games
Asian Games gold medalists for South Korea
Asian Games silver medalists for South Korea
21st-century South Korean people